This is a list of schools of pharmacy in the United States.

Current pharmacy schools 
Accreditation Status based on Accreditation Council for Pharmacy Education

Alabama

Alaska

Arizona

Arkansas

California

Colorado

Connecticut

District of Columbia

Florida

Georgia

Hawaii

Idaho

Illinois

Indiana

Iowa

Kansas

Kentucky

Louisiana

Maine

Maryland

Massachusetts

Michigan

Minnesota

Mississippi

Missouri

Montana

Nebraska

Nevada

New Hampshire

New Jersey

New Mexico

New York

North Carolina

North Dakota

Ohio

Oklahoma

Oregon

Pennsylvania

Puerto Rico

Rhode Island

South Carolina

South Dakota

Tennessee

Texas

Utah

Virginia

Washington

West Virginia

Wisconsin

Wyoming

See also
 History of pharmacy
 List of medical schools

References

External links
 Pharmacy School USA - Directory of Pharmacy Schools in the United States
  - Pharmacy School Admission Requirements - Individual School Information

United States
United States
Pharmacy